In human anatomy, the neurocranium, also known as the braincase, brainpan, or brain-pan is the upper and back part of the skull, which forms a protective case around the brain.   In the human skull, the neurocranium includes the calvaria or skullcap. The remainder of the skull is the facial skeleton.

In comparative anatomy, neurocranium is sometimes used synonymously with endocranium or chondrocranium.

Structure
The neurocranium is divided into two portions:
 the membranous part, consisting of flat bones, which surround the brain; and
 the cartilaginous part, or chondrocranium, which forms bones of the base of the skull.
In humans, the neurocranium is usually considered to include the following eight bones:
 1 ethmoid bone
 1 frontal bone
 1 occipital bone
 2 parietal bones 
 1 sphenoid bone
 2 temporal bones
The ossicles (three on each side) are usually not included as bones of the neurocranium. There may variably also be extra sutural bones present.

Below the neurocranium  is a complex of openings (foramina) and bones, including the foramen magnum which houses the neural spine. The auditory bullae, located in the same region, aid in hearing.

The size of the neurocranium is variable among mammals. The roof may contain ridges such as the temporal crests.

Development
The neurocranium arises from paraxial mesoderm. There is also some contribution of ectomesenchyme. In Chondrichthyes and other cartilaginous vertebrates this portion of the cranium does not ossify; it is not replaced via endochondral ossification.

Other animals 
The neurocranium is formed by the endocranium, the lower portions of the cranial vault, and the skull roof.

Evolutionarily, the human neurocranium has expanded from comprising the back part of the mammalian skull to being also the upper part: during the evolutionary expansion of the brain, the neurocranium has overgrown the splanchnocranium. The upper-frontmost part of the cranium also houses the evolutionarily newest part of the mammal brain, the frontal lobes.

Additional images

See also
Cranial cavity

References

External links
 Earliest Directly-Dated Human Skull-Cups

External links
 

Bones of the head and neck
Human anatomy